Amadora is a municipality and urbanized city in the northwest of the Lisbon metropolitan area and 10 km from central Lisbon. The population in 2011 was 175,136, in an area of 23.78 km² (9.2 sq mi). It is the most densely populated municipality in Portugal.

History
There is significant evidence of Neolithic settlements in the municipality. The Necropolis of Carenque consists of three artificial caves that served as tombs from around 3000 BCE.

Amadora was originally named Porcalhota, for being a Majorat of the daughter of a man surnamed Porcalho who was called for being a female Porcalhota.

The Aqueduto das Águas Livres, which brings water from the Sintra hills to Lisbon, and stretches , was finished in the 1770s and includes the largest masonry arch ever built, located in Campolide — the local coat of arms also displays the aqueduct (like others along its way).

At the request of its population, in 1907, a decree issued during King Carlos I reign, merged the communities of Porcalhota, Amadora and Venteira into one town named Amadora.

At the present time Amadora does not have any airfield. However, in the 1920s a small airfield (the first in Portugal) was located here. The first flight from Portugal to Brazil left from Amadora. The Captain of the airplane was Adm. Gago Coutinho, a well known Portuguese celebrity.

The municipality was formed on 11 September 1979, when it ceased being a parish of the municipality of Oeiras. A few days later, on 17 September, Amadora was granted city status.

The former Sorefame railway rolling stock factory was located in Amadora, but was closed in 2004. Most of the carriages for Portuguese Railways built during the second half of the 20th century were constructed here.

Geography
One of the largest urban communities in Portugal, Amadora forms a conurbation with Lisbon, sharing the same subway, bus and train networks. It is dominated by large apartment blocks, commercial parks, industrial areas and some headquarters of international companies.

Administratively, the municipality is divided into 6 civil parishes (freguesias):
 Águas Livres
 Alfragide
 Encosta do Sol
 Falagueira-Venda Nova
 Mina de Água
 Venteira

Climate
Amadora has a Mediterranean climate (Köppen: Csa) with mild, rainy winters and hot, dry summers.

Economy
Despite being a residential city, Amadora has commercial zones, industries and headquarters of international companies operating in Portugal.

As commercial zones, it has IKEA, Nokia, Decathlon, Alegro, Continente and Ubbo (one of the biggest shopping malls in Europe). Siemens and Roche are examples of international companies based in Amadora.

Transport
Amadora's public transport network is extremely far-reaching and reliable, being fully integrated with the transportation network of the Lisbon metropolitan area. It has 3 metro stations, the commuter Sintra train line with 3 stations, 2 bus services (Vimeca and Carris) and 4 motorways around the city (2ª Circular, CRIL, CREL and IC-16).

Notable people 

 Seomara da Costa Primo (1895 - 1986 in Amadora) a botany professor, educator and author of school textbooks on scientific subjects
 Cruzeiro Seixas (1920 – 2020) a "man who paints" and a Portuguese poet
 Maria José Valério (1933–2021) a Portuguese singer, she sang popular music and fado.
 Marcelino da Mata (1940 in Ponte Nova – 2021 in Amadora) a highly decorated Portuguese Army officer, born in Portuguese Guinea
 João Baião (born 1963 in Buraca) a TV presenter, entertainer and actor.
 José Miguel Ribeiro (born 1966 in Amadora) a Portuguese film director.

Sport 
 Jorge Jesus (born 1954) a football manager and former player; former manager of Benfica
 Rui Costa (born 1972) a retired footballer with 498 club caps and 94 with Portugal
 Vasco Matos (born 1980) a Portuguese retired professional footballer with 405 club caps 
 Diogo Silva (born 1983 in Amadora) a Portuguese footballer with over 300 club caps 
 Nani (born 1986) a footballer with close to 400 club caps and 112 with Portugal
 Miguel Tavares (born 1993) a volleyball player with the Portugal men's national volleyball team
 Diana Silva (born 1995) a footballer who plays for Aston Villa W.F.C. and the Portugal women's national football team
 Rúben Dias (born 1997) a footballer who plays for Manchester City F.C. and has 37 caps with Portugal
 Renato Sanches (born 1997) a footballer who plays for Paris Saint-Germain F.C. and has 32 caps with Portugal

Gallery

Culture
Every year, Amadora city organizes the Amadora International Comics Festival.

See also
Roads in Portugal

References

External links

 Amadora International Comics Festival - official festival Web site
 Photos from AMADORA
  - media information
 https://www.municipiosefreguesias.pt/municipio/1/camara-municipal-da-amadora - Portal Nacional dos Municípios e Freguesias - Município da Amadora

 
Cities in Portugal
Populated places in Lisbon District
Municipalities of Lisbon District